Nicholas Glyn Paul Gumbel (born 1955), known as Nicky Gumbel, is an English Anglican priest and author in the evangelical and charismatic traditions. He is known as the developer of the Alpha Course, a basic introduction to Christianity supported by churches of many Christian traditions. He was Vicar of Holy Trinity Brompton in the Diocese of London, Church of England from 2005 to 2022.

Early life and career
Nicky Gumbel was born on 28 April 1955 in London, England. He is the son of Walter Gumbel, a German secular Jew from Stuttgart whose licence to practise law in that city was withdrawn in one of the early Nazi purges. Walter Gumbel emigrated to Britain and became a successful barrister. Gumbel's mother, Muriel, was a barrister and nominal Christian. 

Gumbel was educated at Eton College. He studied law at Trinity College, Cambridge, graduating with a Bachelor of Arts (BA) degree in 1976; as per tradition, his BA degree was later promoted to a Master of Arts (MA) degree.  He converted to Christianity while attending university in 1974. After graduating from university, Gumbel followed in his father's footsteps and became a practising barrister. Meanwhile, he became a regular worshipper at Holy Trinity Brompton Church, Knightsbridge. In January 1978 Gumbel married, at the church, Pippa, with whom he would go on to have three children.

In 1982 Gumbel announced his decision to leave the bar to train for ordination in the Church of England. In 1983 he began theological studies and training for ordained ministry at Wycliffe Hall, Oxford. He graduated with a BA degree in 1986; as per tradition, his BA degree was later promoted to an MA degree.

Ordained ministry
Gumbel was ordained in the Church of England as a deacon in 1986. After some difficulty in finding a curacy, he joined the staff of his "home" church of Holy Trinity Brompton (HTB) in the Diocese of London. He was ordained as a priest in 1987. In 1996, the Bishop of London appointed him Alpha Chaplain, though he remained at HTB as a curate. In 2005, Gumbel was officially installed as Vicar of Holy Trinity Brompton Church. The previous vicar, Sandy Millar, had retired from stipendiary ministry and became an assistant bishop in the Diocese of London.

In 2007, Gumbel was awarded an honorary doctorate by the University of Gloucestershire as recognition of his broad contribution to the wider church through Alpha.

Alpha Course
In 1990, Gumbel took over the running of the Alpha Course that had been running there since 1977. The course was transformed under his leadership from being one designed for new Christians to one primarily for those outside the church who would not consider themselves Christians. Gumbel serves as the public face of the course, being described by James Heard as something of a "Weberian charismatic leader".

Gumbel is the author of a number of books related to the Alpha Course, including Questions of Life which has sold over 1,000,000 copies. Voted "Christian Book of the Year" in 1994, it has been published in 48 languages. Other related books include Why Jesus, Searching Issues, Telling Others, A Life Worth Living, Challenging Lifestyle, Heart of Revival, and 30 Days.

See also

 Evangelical Anglicanism
 Nicky Lee (priest)
 Low church
 Toronto Blessing

References

Further reading

External links
 Holy Trinity Brompton Church website
 Gumbel sermon archive

1955 births
20th-century English Anglican priests
21st-century English Anglican priests
Alumni of Trinity College, Cambridge
Alumni of Wycliffe Hall, Oxford
Anglican writers
Converts to Anglicanism from atheism or agnosticism
People educated at Eton College
English Charismatics
English evangelicals
English people of German-Jewish descent
Evangelical Anglican clergy
Evangelicalism in the Church of England
Holy Trinity Brompton people
Living people
Clergy from London
Lawyers from London
English barristers